Richard Pile (born 1849) was an seaman serving in the United States Navy who received the Medal of Honor for bravery.

Biography
Richard T. Pile was born in 1849 on Barbados and, after emigrating to the United States, he joined the Navy in Boston, Massachusetts on November 26, 1870. 

For his actions received the Medal of Honor March 20, 1905.

Medal of Honor citation
Rank and organization: Ordinary Seaman, U.S. Navy. Born: 1849, West Indies. Accredited to: Massachusetts. G.O. No.: 176, 9 July 1872.

Citation:

Serving on board the U.S.S. Kansas, Pile displayed great coolness and self-possession at the time Comdr. A. F. Crosman and others were drowned, near Greytown, Nicaragua, 12 April 1872, and by his extraordinary heroism and personal exertion prevented greater loss of

See also

List of Medal of Honor recipients during peacetime

References

External links

1849 births
Year of death missing
United States Navy Medal of Honor recipients
United States Navy sailors
People from Massachusetts
Foreign-born Medal of Honor recipients
Burials in New York (state)
Non-combat recipients of the Medal of Honor
American people of Barbadian descent